Year 1371 (MCCCLXXI) was a common year starting on Wednesday (link will display the full calendar) of the Julian calendar.

Events 
 January–December 
 January – Edward, the Black Prince, gives up the administration of Aquitaine and returns to England, because of his poor health and heavy debts.
 February 17 – Rival brothers Ivan Sratsimir and Ivan Shishman become co-Emperors of Bulgaria after the death of their father, Ivan Alexander. Bulgaria is weakened by the split.
 February 22 – Robert II becomes the first Stuart king of Scotland, after the death of his uncle, David II.
 April 9 – Emperor Go-En'yu of Japan succeeds Emperor Go-Kōgon of Japan, becoming the 5th and last Emperor of the Northern Court.
 August 22 – Battle of Baesweiler: Brabant is unexpectedly defeated by the Duchy of Jülich.
 September 21 – John of Gaunt, son of King Edward III of England, marries Constance of Castile, daughter of King Pedro of Castile, giving John a claim to the throne of Castile.
 September 26 – Battle of Maritsa: Most of the nobility in Serbia are killed by the Ottomans.  
 December – Lazar succeeds his distant cousin, Stefan Uroš V, as ruler of Serbia, but declines the title of Tsar.

 Date unknown 
 Charterhouse Carthusian Monastery is founded in Aldersgate, London.
 The first widely accepted historical reference is made to playing cards (in Spain).
 Polish priest Andrzej Jastrzębiec becomes the first bishop of Siret, thus bringing Catholicism to Moldavia.
 Zhao Bing Fa becomes King of Mong Mao (in modern-day south China/north Myanmar) after the death of his father, Si Kefa.
 Kalamegha claims the vacant title of King of Cambodia after the power of the Thai invaders from Ayutthaya begins to weaken. The Ayutthayans are finally expelled in 1375.
 Byzantine co-emperor John V Palaiologos pledges loyalty to the Ottoman Empire, to prevent the Turks from invading Constantinople.
 The Hongwu Emperor of the Ming dynasty in China introduces the census registration system of lijia, or the hundreds-and-tithing system, throughout the Yangzi Valley. This system groups households into units of ten and groups of one hundred, whereupon their capacities for paying taxes and providing the state with corvée labor service can be assessed. The system becomes fully operational in 1381, when it counts 59,873,305 people living in China (the historian Timothy Brook asserts that the number was much higher, somewhere between 65 million and 75 million).

Births 
 May 28 – John the Fearless (d. 1419)
 September 21 – Frederick I, Elector of Brandenburg (d. 1440)
 December 30 – Prince Vasily I of Moscow (d. 1425)
 date unknown
 Leopold IV, Duke of Austria (d. 1411)
 Sophia of Lithuania, regent of Lithuania (d. 1453)
 Zheng He, Chinese mariner and explorer (d. 1433)
 probable – Isabeau de Bavière, queen of Charles VI of France (d. 1435)

Deaths 
 January/February – Paul, Latin Patriarch of Constantinople
 February 17 – Ivan Alexander of Bulgaria 
 February 22 – David II of Scotland (b. 1324)
 March 4 – Jeanne d'Évreux, queen consort of France (b. 1310)
 September – Thomas de Vere, 8th Earl of Oxford (b. c. 1336)
 September 26 – Jovan Uglješa, Serbian despot
 September 26 – Vukašin Mrnjavčević, Serbian king

References